Hyundai oil bank is a petroleum and refinery company with its headquarters in Seosan, South Korea. It was established in 1964 as Kukdong Oil Industry Company and later taken over by the Hyundai Group (1993).  It is currently a part of the Hyundai Heavy Industries Group.  Its primary business is petroleum products, similar to the SK Energy, GS Caltex, S-Oil.

See also
Economy of South Korea
Hyundai Heavy Industries Group

External links
 Hyundai Oil Bank Homepage 
 History | Overview

Hyundai Heavy Industries Group
Oil companies of South Korea
Chemical companies of South Korea
Automotive companies of South Korea
Automotive fuel retailers
Non-renewable resource companies established in 1964